The 2020 British Athletics Championships (known for sponsorship reasons as the Müller British Athletics Championships) was the national championship in outdoor track and field for athletes in the United Kingdom. The championship took place on 4–5 September 2020, having been postponed from June 2020 due to the COVID-19 pandemic.

Background

 
The championship was originally scheduled for 20–21 June 2020, but in April 2020 it was postponed until 8–9 August due to the COVID-19 pandemic. In June 2020, the event was postponed again, to 4–5 September 2020. The championship was held at the Manchester Regional Arena, as part of a three-year agreement to hold the event in Manchester from 2020 to 2022; from 2008 to 2019, the championships had been held at the Alexander Stadium in Birmingham. The entire event was held behind closed doors, due to the COVID-19 pandemic. The stadium contained cardboard cut outs of some fans. The event was originally intended as a qualifying event for the 2020 Summer Olympics. After the Olympics were postponed until 2021, the 2021 Championships were used as the Olympic qualifying event.

Almost 500 athletes competed at the championship. Notable athletes missing from the championship included Dina Asher-Smith, Mo Farah, Katarina Johnson-Thompson, and Laura Muir. Farah instead competed at the Diamond League event in Brussels, where he broke the one hour run world record. Muir instead competed in the World Athletics Continental Tour's Kamila Skolimowska Memorial event in Poland, where she won the 1500 metres race.

Highlights
In the men's pole vault event, Harry Coppell broke the British national record by clearing a height of 5.85m. In the women's 3,000 metres steeplechase, Aimee Pratt set a record time at the British Athletics Championships. On 5 September, seven stadium records were set during the Championships. Hannah Taunton set the world record in the 5,000 metres T20 event, and Aimee Pratt set the year's fastest time in the 3000m steeplechase event.

The men's 800 metres event was won by Daniel Rowden in a sprint finish with Jake Wightman, who finished second. Holly Bradshaw won her eighth British pole vault title. In the absence of Dina Asher-Smith, 22-year old Imani-Lara Lansiquot won the women's 100 metres race, which was her first British title.

Results

Men

Women

Parasports – Men

Parasports – Women

References

External links
British Athletics

2020
British Outdoor Championships
Athletics Outdoor
Athletics Championships
Sports competitions in Manchester
Athletics (track and field) events postponed due to the COVID-19 pandemic